China competed at the 1988 Summer Paralympics, held in Seoul, South Korea. The country was represented by 43 athletes competing in four sports: athletics, swimming, table tennis and shooting. Chinese competitors won 41 medals, of which 16 gold, and finished in fifteenth place on the medal table.

Medalists

See also
China at the Paralympics
China at the 1988 Summer Olympics
Sports in China

References

External links
Seoul 1988 Press Release - IPC
International Paralympic Committee
National Paralympic Committee of China (NPCC) - short introduction

Nations at the 1988 Summer Paralympics
1988
Paralympics